The Charity Cup (known as the ASB Charity Cup for sponsorship reasons) is New Zealand's association football super cup, which takes place on annual basis.

The competition was founded in 1978 as the NZFA Challenge Trophy. The Champions of the National Soccer League and the Chatham Cup would compete. It stopped taking place after 1987.

The tournament was re-introduced in 2011 as the ASB Charity Cup. The ASB Premiership Grand Final winner meets the best performing New Zealand representative in the OFC Champions League.

Following the restructuring of football in New Zealand in 2021, the Charity Cup will once again be contested by the winner of the Chatham Cup and the winner of the National League, beginning with the 2022 season.

Champions

References 

New Zealand
Association football cup competitions in New Zealand
Recurring sporting events established in 2011
New Zealand sports trophies and awards